Alex, Inc. is an American sitcom created by Matt Tarses that aired on ABC from March 28 to May 16, 2018. Based on Gimlet Media, Inc.'s StartUp, the series stars Zach Braff, Tiya Sircar, Hillary Anne Matthews, Elisha Henig, Audyssie James and Michael Imperioli.

Premise 
The series follows Alex Schuman, a radio journalist, husband, and father of two, who decides to quit his job and start his own company.

Cast and characters

Main 
 Zach Braff as Alex Schuman, a radio journalist, Rooni's husband, and father of Ben and Soraya, who has left his old job to start his own podcast company
 Tiya Sircar as Arunima “Rooni” Schuman, a lawyer, Alex's wife, and mother of Ben and Soraya
 Hillary Anne Matthews as Deirdre, a producer at Alex's old job who left with him for his new company
 Elisha Henig as Ben Schuman, Alex and Rooni's son
 Audyssie James as Soraya Schuman, Alex and Rooni's daughter
 Michael Imperioli as Eddie, Alex's cousin and an investor in the new company

Notable guest stars 
 Natalie Morales as Serena Bans (episode: "The Rube Goldberg Contraption")

Production

Development 
On August 29, 2016, it was announced that ABC had ordered Start Up, a single-camera comedy television series, as a put pilot. Matt Tarses, Zach Braff, John Davis, John Fox, Chris Giliberti, Alex Blumberg, and Matt Lieber serve as executive producers. Zach Braff also serves as director. The series is a production of Davis Entertainment and is based on the podcast StartUp. On January 25, 2017, it was announced that a pilot for the series was officially picked up. On May 11, 2017, it was announced that the series was officially picked up. The series is further a production of Sony Pictures Television and ABC Studios. On May 16, 2017, it was announced that the series was renamed to Alex, Inc. On January 8, 2018, it was announced that the series would premiere on March 28, 2018. On May 9, 2018, it was announced that the series was canceled after one season.

Casting 
On August 29, 2016, it was announced that Zach Braff was cast in the series. On February 15, 2017, it was announced that Tiya Sircar was cast in the series. On March 8, 2017, it was announced that Michael Imperioli was cast in the series. On March 14, 2017, it was announced that Hillary Anne Matthews was cast in the series. On March 22, 2017, it was announced that Chris Sacca would play himself in the series. On May 11, 2017, it was announced that Elisha Henig and Audyssie James were cast in the series. On February 8, 2018, it was announced that Sophia Bush would guest star in the series.

Episodes

Reception

Critical 
On the review aggregator website Rotten Tomatoes, the series has an approval rating of 40% based on 15 reviews, with an average rating of 4.46/10. The site's critics consensus reads, "By failing to establish the credibility of its lead, Alex, Inc loses sight an appealing premise and strands a likable Zach Braff in a sea of wasted potential." Metacritic, which uses a weighted average, assigned a score of 49 out of 100 based on 10 critics, indicating "mixed or average reviews".

Ratings

Overall 
 
}}

Season 1

References

External links 
 

2010s American single-camera sitcoms
2010s American workplace comedy television series
2018 American television series debuts
2018 American television series endings
American Broadcasting Company original programming
English-language television shows
Television shows based on podcasts
Television series by ABC Studios
Television series by Sony Pictures Television
Gimlet Media